Casimir Dunin Markievicz (15 March 1874 – 2 December 1932), known as Count Markievicz, was a Polish playwright, theatre director, and painter, and the husband of the Irish revolutionary Constance Markievicz.

Early life and marriage

The Dunin Markievicz family held land in Malopolska Province (today Ukraine), and had an estate in a town of Zywotow (now ) where Casimir grew up. Markievicz attended the State Gymnasium in Kherson, and studied law at the University in Kyiv which at that time still held a vast Polish minority. In 1895, he transferred to the École des Beaux-Arts in Paris. While in Paris, he met and married Jadwiga Splawa-Neyman. They had two sons, Stanislas and Ryszard, but the marriage did not last. Jadwiga returned to Ukraine where she and Ryszard died in 1899. He met Constance Gore-Booth in 1899, and the two mixed in the bohemian Paris society of the time.

In Paris, Markievicz styled himself as "Count Markievicz". When Constance's family enquired as to the validity of the title, they were informed through Pyotr Rachkovsky of the Russian Secret Police that he had taken the title "without right", and that there had never been a "Count Markievicz" in Poland. However, the Department of Genealogy in Saint Petersburg said that he was entitled to claim to be a member of the Szlachta, of whom there were several hundred thousand in 1900. Markievicz and Gore-Booth married in London in 1900, and their daughter, Maeve, was born the following year. From 1902 the couple lived in Dublin. He continued to be known as "Count Markievicz" (and Constance as "Countess Markievicz"), and in the 1911 census gave his occupation as "Count (Russian nobility)". Stanislas later said in a letter that his father had not been a count.

Artistic life
Markievicz was part of the literary circle that centred on W. B. Yeats, Lady Gregory, J.M. Synge, and the Abbey Theatre. In 1910 he formed his own theatre company, the Independent Dramatic Company, which staged plays written by himself and starring his wife, Constance.

Return to Poland
In 1913, Markievicz moved back to Poland, and never returned to live in Ireland. However, he did correspond with his wife in Dublin and he was by her side when she died in 1927.

Towards the end of his life Markievicz was active in Warsaw, as well as a correspondent for British magazines, such as the Londoner Daily News. He also wrote the screenplay of a 1920 Polish film, Powrót, directed by Aleksander Hertz. His paintings included portraits, landscapes, and genre painting. The largest part of his art collection is held in Dublin, some remain in Poland (National Museum, Kraków, and in private collections). His talent lent itself particularly to the large oil portraits of two Polish statesmen: Marshal Piłsudski and Stanisław Wojciechowski. A catalogue for his works is still pending.

He died in Warsaw, Republic of Poland, in December 1932.

Plays
(Source: Productions of the Irish Theatre Movement, 1899-1916)
Seymour's Redemption, Abbey Theatre, 9 March 1908
The Dilettante, Abbey Theatre, 3 December 1908
Home Sweet Home (with Nora Fitzpatrick), Abbey Theatre, 3 December 1908
The Memory of the Dead, Abbey Theatre, 14 April 1910
Mary, Abbey Theatre, 14 April 1910
Rival Stars, Gaiety Theatre, 11 December 1911

References

19th-century Polish painters
19th-century Polish male artists
20th-century Polish painters
20th-century Polish male artists
20th-century Polish dramatists and playwrights
Polish male dramatists and playwrights
Duninowie
Artists from Warsaw
Artist authors
Polish nobility
People from Vinnytsia Oblast
People from the Russian Empire of Polish descent
1874 births
1932 deaths
Polish male painters